The fourth Queen Elisabeth Music Competition took place in Brussels in 1952. It was the second post-war edition of the competition, which had been resumed the previous year, and the second one devoted to piano, 14 years after the first one took place. 

It was won by Leon Fleisher.

Palmares

Jury
  Willem Andriessen
  Stefan Askenase
  Emile Bosquet
  Marcelle Cheridjian
  Harriet Cohen
  Marta de Conciliis
  Marcel Cuvalier (chairman)
  René Defossez
  Olin Downes
  Rudolf Firkušný
  Walter Kerschbaumer
  Kathleen Long
  Marguerite Long
  Carlo Van Neste
  Theo van der Pas
  Eduardo del Pueyo
  Arthur Rubinstein
  Naum Sluszny
  Magda Tagliaferro

References
  Queen Elisabeth Music Competition

04
1952 in Belgium
1950s in Brussels